The 2002 Swedish Open was a men's tennis tournament played on outdoor clay courts in Båstad in Sweden and was part of the International Series of the 2002 ATP Tour. It was the 55th edition of the tournament and ran from 8 July until 14 July 2002. Third-seeded Carlos Moyá won the singles title.

Finals

Singles

 Carlos Moyá defeated  Younes El Aynaoui 6–3, 2–6, 7–5
 It was Moyá's 2nd singles title of the year and the 9th of his career.

Doubles

 Jonas Björkman /  Todd Woodbridge defeated  Paul Hanley /  Michael Hill 7–6(8–6), 6–4
 It was Björkman's 5th title of the year and the 34th of his career. It was Woodbridge's 4th title of the year and the 76th of his career.

References

External links
 Official website
 ATP tournament profile

Swedish Open
Swedish Open
Swedish Open
July 2002 sports events in Europe
Swed